Will Heggie is a Scottish musician.  He co-founded Cocteau Twins in 1979 with Robin Guthrie, and served as the bassist for them until 1983. Immediately after departing Cocteau Twins, he helped form Lowlife and played bass with them from 1983 to 1997.

References

Year of birth missing (living people)
Living people
Scottish bass guitarists
Cocteau Twins members